Deitsch may refer to:
Deitsch (surname)
Pennsylvania Dutch
Pennsylvania Dutch language